Retired Rear Admiral Mary Joan Nielubowicz was the Director of the Navy Nurse Corps from 1983 to 1987.

Early life
Mary Joan Nielubowicz was born on 5 February 1929 in Shenandoah, Pennsylvania to Joseph and Ursula Nielubowicz and graduated from Shenandoah Catholic High School. She earned a nursing diploma from Misericordia Hospital, Philadelphia, in 1950.

Navy Nurse Corps career
Nielubowicz joined the Navy Nurse Corps in 1951. While in the Nurse Corps, she earned a Bachelor of Science degree from the University of Colorado in 1961 and a Master of Science degree in Nursing from the University of Pennsylvania in 1965.

She served in areas around the globe, including Portsmouth, Virginia, Corona, California, Guantanamo Bay, Cuba, Annapolis, Maryland, Philadelphia, Washington, D.C., Iwakuni, Japan, Cherry Point, North Carolina, Guam and Long Beach, California.

Billets of increasing responsibility included that of senior nurse at the branch clinic in Iwakuni, Japan in 1967. In 1979 she became director of nursing services at the Naval Regional Medical Center, Portsmouth, Virginia.

She became director of the Navy Nurse Corps in 1983, and was promoted to the rank of Commodore (equivalent to today's Rear Admiral (lower half). In 1985 the rank was changed to Rear Admiral.). She served concurrently as deputy commander for Personnel Management and later as deputy commander for Health Care Operations.

In 1986, Navy Nurse Corps members of the Association of Military Surgeons of the United States (AMSUS) established the Mary J. Nielubowicz Essay Award in recognition of her outstanding support and encouragement of active and reserve nurses.

Admiral Nielubowicz died at her home in Fairfax, Virginia on 24 March 2008. She was interred at Arlington National Cemetery on 21 May 2008.

See also
Navy Nurse Corps
Women in the United States Navy

References

Further reading

External links
 Nurses and the U.S. Navy -- Overview and Special Image Selection Naval Historical Center
 Mary J. Nielubowicz

1929 births
2008 deaths
People from Shenandoah, Pennsylvania
American nurses
American women nurses
University of Colorado alumni
University of Pennsylvania School of Nursing alumni
Female admirals of the United States Navy
United States Navy rear admirals (lower half)
Recipients of the Legion of Merit
Burials at Arlington National Cemetery
20th-century American women
21st-century American women
Military personnel from Pennsylvania